William Joseph Wagner (January 2, 1894 – January 11, 1951) was an American baseball catcher. He was born in 1894 in Jesup, Iowa. Wagner played parts of five seasons in Major League Baseball and was a member of the Pittsburgh Pirates from 1914 to 1917 and the Boston Braves in 1918. He played in 93 career games, with 50 hits and 1 home run and a batting average of .207. Wagner died in 1951 in Waterloo, Iowa.

Over a decade after Bill Wagner's death, a controversy arose whether he had pinch hit for teammate Honus Wagner in 1917, which would thereby have made him the only player to have done so. Later examination of National League archives proved the allegation incorrect.

References

External links

1894 births
1951 deaths
Baseball players from Iowa
Major League Baseball catchers
Pittsburgh Pirates players
Boston Braves players
Waterloo Jays players
Youngstown Steelmen players
Terre Haute Highlanders players
Columbus Senators players
People from Jesup, Iowa